Jennifer Rice is a Canadian politician, who was elected to the Legislative Assembly of British Columbia to represent the electoral district of North Coast. She is a member of the BC New Democratic Party. Rice was first elected as a member of legislative assembly (MLA) in the 2013 provincial election and was re-elected in the 2017 election. In the 40th Parliament of British Columbia she acted as the official opposition's
critic for northern and rural economic development and deputy critic for children and family development and introduced one private member bill, the Drinking Water Protection (Safe Water for Schools) Amendment Act regarding regularizing testing of drinking water in schools.

Prior to the election as an MLA, Rice served a year and a half as a municipal councillor in the city of Prince Rupert, British Columbia. Since moving to Prince Rupert to attend the coastal ecology program at Northwest Community College (now Coast Mountain College)), she has worked a biological technician, a staff member at the T. Buck Suzuki Environmental Foundation, and a scuba diving and kayaking instructor.

Background
Jennifer Rice was born and raised in Ottawa, Ontario. Following high school she worked at long-term care facilities and as an open water scuba diving and kayaking instructor. She moved to Prince Rupert, British Columbia, in 2003 to attend Coast Mountain College's applied coastal ecology program. She helped open the World Wildlife Fund's Prince Rupert office as a volunteer and a staff member. She acted as chair of the non-profit organization called the Friends of Wild Salmon and, in 2009, she went to work for the T. Buck Suzuki Foundation. During this time she was a vocal opponent of the Northern Gateway project. She was elected to the Prince Rupert city council in 2011 and was on council when they unanimously voted to oppose the Northern Gateway project.

North Coast MLA Gary Coons announced his retirement in September 2012. To replace him as the NDP candidate in the next election, Rice and teacher, and president of the Prince Rupert District Teachers Union, Joanna Larson put the names forward. In the January 2013 nomination election, Rice defeated Larson. In the general election, Rice was challenged by Judy Fraser of the BC Liberal Party and college professor Hondo Arendt of the Green Party, though Rice was favoured to win.

40th Parliament
Entering the 40th Parliament of British Columbia Jennifer Rice was viewed as a MLA that provided the BC NDP with credibility on environmental issues. She was assigned to be critic on rural and northern health and deputy critic to the Ministry of Children and Family Development and appointed to the Select Standing Committee on Children and Youth. In this critic role she toured rural BC, including stops in Clearwater, Ashcroft, Quesnel, Dawson Creek, Fort Nelson, as well as Vancouver Island and the Gulf Islands, to consult with healthcare service providers, advocates, and new parents using maternity care. She also spent the third and fourth sessions on the Select Standing Committee on Health and the fifth session on the Select Standing Committee on Finance and Government Services.

Rice was vocal in drawing attention to the Highway of Tears and, in particular, advocating for implementation of the recommendation from the Missing Women Commission of Inquiry for more transportation options along Highway 16 between Prince George and Prince Rupert. Despite the Inquiry's recommendation, the provincial government's Passenger Transportation Board approved a reduction of intercity bus service, provided by Greyhound Canada, along that route in 2013. Along with fellow NDP MLAs Carole James and Maurine Karagianis, Rice traveled the highway together advocating for shuttle bus service. Over the next few years, the province committed funds to assisting communities in purchasing public transit vehicles, extending their routes towards Highway 16, and increasing the number of licensed drivers in First Nations. Regular bus service was eventually implemented and began in 2017.

In November 2014 Ms. Rice drew attention to the issue of charging passengers who use wheelchairs an extra $30 for a cabin on the Inside Passage and Haida Gwaii ferry routes, labelling the practice as unfair. In response Transportation Minister Todd Stone indicated he would reverse this practice.

Concerning liquefied natural gas, several export facilities were proposed or undergoing environmental assessments within her riding. Rice opposed the development of the Petronas Pacific Northwest LNG facility on Lelu Island, with its proposed bridge over the Flora Banks to the shipping terminal, due to its anticipated impacts to the Skeena River salmon ecosystem. Along with the region's other two NDP MLAs, Doug Donaldson of Stikine and Robin Austin of Skeena, she endorsed the signing of the Lelu Island Declaration by the Nine Allied Tribes of Lax Kw’alaams which called for permanent protection of Lelu Island and the Flora and Agnew Banks "as a refuge for wild salmon and marine resources", though the Tsimshian First Nations objected to the signing of the declaration. Rice expressed support of the development of an LNG facility within her riding given proper siting conditions.

Rice introduced a private member's bill in April 2016, Drinking Water Protection (Safe Water for Schools) Amendment Act (Bill M-215), which would require the regular testing of drinking water in schools. The bill was in response to elevated lead levels found in Prince Rupert and Kitimat schools, and had the support of the British Columbia Teachers' Federation. The bill did not advance beyond the first reading, but the government still adopted a system of reminders for school districts to test for lead on an annual basis and report back to the Ministry of Education. Independent MLA Vicki Huntington and political columnist Vaughn Palmer praised Rice for her work on drinking water safety.

41st Parliament
As the 2017 general election approached, Rice was acclaimed as the BC NDP candidate in the North Coast riding. She was challenged by former Prince Rupert mayor and community relations advisor (for a company seeking to build a LNG facility) Herb Pond for the BC Liberals and Hondo Arendt again for the BC Green Party. Rice was re-elected with over 50% of the vote. With Rice's BC NDP forming the government beginning with the second session of the 41st Parliament of British Columbia, Premier John Horgan appointed Rice to be the Parliamentary Secretary for Emergency Preparedness within the Ministry of Public Safety. With the resignation of local Member of Parliament Nathan Cullen, Rice was considered as a suitable NDP nominee, however she declined.

Electoral record

References

External links
Jennifer Rice

British Columbia New Democratic Party MLAs
Canadian LGBT people in provincial and territorial legislatures
Living people
People from Prince Rupert, British Columbia
Politicians from Ottawa
Women MLAs in British Columbia
21st-century Canadian politicians
21st-century Canadian women politicians
Year of birth missing (living people)
21st-century Canadian LGBT people